The Indian Navy's Information Management and Analysis Centre (IMAC) was approved in 2012 and operationalized in 2014. Located in Gurugram, it is the nodal agency for maritime data fusion that links information from the high seas and Indian's coastline and island territories.

IMAC tracks only non-military shipping, whereas the Directorate of Naval Operations tracks military vessels on another classified network. A multi-agency center named as National Maritime Domain Awareness centre (NDMA centre) is also being considered.

The Information Management and Analysis Centre was conceived after the 2008 Mumbai attacks which took place on 26 November 2008 and is also known as 26/11. The terrorist attacks took place from the sea, being the first recorded act of maritime terrorism in India. In this attack, 10 terrorists from Lashkar e Taiba used the sea route for their journey from Pakistan and infiltrated into Mumbai after hijacking an Indian fishing boat.

The project was approved by the Defence Acquisition Council in 2012 at a cost of ₹450 crore and was inaugurated by the then Defence Minister, Manohar Parrikar. It is the nodal centre of the National Command Control Communication and Intelligence (NC3I) Network, which was established to link 51 operational Centres of Indian Navy and the Coast Guard spread across the country’s coastline, including the island territories. The IMAC tracks vessels on the high seas and gets data from the coastal radars, white shipping agreements, Automatic Identification Systems (AIS) transponders fitted on merchant ships, air and traffic management system and global shipping databases.

Information Fusion Centre – Indian Ocean region 
The Information Fusion Centre – Indian Ocean region (IFC–IOR), was set up in the IMAC in 2018-2019, as a regional information coordination body, that coordinates with 21 partner countries and 22 multi-national agencies.  The need to set up such a surveillance and information management system was felt following the 2008 Mumbai attacks. While most coordination is done virtually, liaison officers include those from United States, France, Japan, Australia, United Kingdom and Seychelles.

Challenges 
In 2020, reports emerged that even 12 years after the Mumbai attacks, around 60 percent (about 150,000) of small fishing boats lack an identification system.

See also 

 Integrated Coastal Surveillance System

References

External links 

 Official website of Information Fusion Centre – Indian Ocean region (IFC–IOR)

Indian Navy
Government agencies established in 2014
2014 establishments in India